Cecil Ross Burnett (27 April 1872 – 6 December 1933) was a British landscape artist and portraitist. He signed his work "C. Ross Burnett".

Early life and education
Burnett was born in Old Charlton, Kent; his father, William Charles Burnett, was a banker. He trained at Blackheath School of Art and the Westminster School of Art before entering the Royal Academy School in 1892. In 1895 he won the Turner gold medal and a scholarship for landscape painting, and a silver medal for a portrait from life.

Career
He specialised in portraits and in mostly rural landscapes, many created near Amberley, Sussex, where he had a cottage. He worked in oil and watercolour, and was a member of the New Society of Painters in Water-Colours from 1910 and of the Langham Sketching Club and the Pencil Society.

Burnett exhibited at the Royal Academy and elsewhere. He entered works in the art competitions at the 1928 Summer Olympics and the 1932 Summer Olympics.

In 1898 he founded the Sidcup School of Art; he was its principal for many years.

Personal life and death
In 1903 Burnett married Alice Theresa Allenberg, from South Africa; they had a son and a daughter and lived in Blackheath, London, where he died on 6 December 1933.

References

1872 births
1933 deaths
20th-century British painters
British male painters
Members of the Royal Institute of Painters in Water Colours
Olympic competitors in art competitions
People from Charlton, London
Alumni of the Royal Academy Schools
Academics of Sidcup Art College
People from Kent
20th-century British male artists